Swayamkrushi is a 1987 Indian Telugu-language drama film written and directed by K. Viswanath.  The film stars Chiranjeevi and Vijayashanti in main leads, while Sarvadaman D. Banerjee, and Sumalatha in other pivotal roles.

The film chronicles the life of a self-educated cobbler's journey from rags to riches. The film was screened at the International Film Festival of India, the Asia Pacific Film Festival; the film was dubbed into Russian and was screened at the special mention section at the Moscow International Film Festival. Chiranjeevi garnered the Indian Express Best Actor, and the Nandi Award for Best Actor award for his performance. Vijayashanti garnered the Filmfare Award for Best Actress for her performance in the film.

Plot
Sambayya (Chiranjeevi) is a cobbler who raises his late sister's son Chinna (Arjun/Sirish) while also financing the education of the orphaned Sarada (Sumalatha).  He also nurses a love crush and intends to marry her someday.
In a turn of events, Sarada marries Bhaskar (Sarvadaman Banerjee) and Ganga (Vijayashanti) who has also nursed a love towards Sambayya, has a tubectomy in order to marry Sambayya.  She does it so that she would be a completely dedicated mother to Chinna.  After initial struggles, Ganga and Sambayya own a shoe business and become wealthy.

Chinna's actual father Govind (Charan Raj) who is a criminal returns from prison and teams up with Ganga's father (a no-good father, role with villain shades) to make a series of demands on Sambayya and to claim Chinna's guardianship.

Eventually, Chinna rebels against his father and both he and Sambayya return to latter's modest original profession of cobbler.

Cast
 Chiranjeevi as Sambayya
 Vijayashanti as Ganga
 Sumalatha as Sarada
 Master Arjun as Chinna
 Charan Raj as Govind
 Sarvadaman Banerjee as Bhaskar
 J.V. Somayajulu
 Brahmanandam
 M. V. S. Haranatha Rao
 P. L. Narayana
 S. K. Misro
 Baby Bhavana as young Sarada
 Dubbing Janaki
 Samyuktha

Soundtrack

Soundtrack composed by Ramesh Naidu was released through Lahari Music label. Lyrics were written by C. Narayana Reddy, Sirivennela Seetharama Sastry while a song written by Kshetrayya was also used in this film.

Awards
Cinema Express Best Actor - Chiranjeevi
Nandi Award for Best Actor - Chiranjeevi
Filmfare Award for Best Actress - Telugu - Vijayashanti

References

External links
 

Indian business films
Films directed by K. Viswanath
1980s Telugu-language films
1980s business films
Indian films based on actual events
1987 films
Fiction about social issues
Fiction about society
Works about economics
Films scored by Ramesh Naidu
Fiction about shoemakers
Alternative education